Dawn-Lyen Gardner is an American actress. She is best known for her leading role as Charley Bordelon West in the Oprah Winfrey Network drama series Queen Sugar.

Early life 
Gardner was born in Los Angeles, California. Gardner is of mixed heritage and has an African-American father and a Chinese mother.

After graduating from Los Angeles County High School for the Arts in 1999, Gardner later moved to New York City and attended Juilliard School with actress Rutina Wesley who she would later go on to work with in the TV show Queen Sugar. Gardner graduated from Juilliard in 2003.

Career
She began acting on television at an early age, appearing in a recurring role on Viper and guest starred on ER. While attending Juilliard, Gardner began acting on stage, appearing in such productions like For Colored Girls, The School of Night, and The Seagull. She also has appeared in a number of regional productions. She also had number of guest-starring roles on television shows such as Crossing Jordan, Bones, Heroes, and Castle. Gardner also worked as voice actress playing Steela Gerrera in the Star Wars: The Clone Wars.

In 2016, Gardner is cast as a lead character alongside Rutina Wesley in the Oprah Winfrey Network drama series, Queen Sugar created and produced by Ava DuVernay and Oprah Winfrey.

Filmography

References

External links

Living people
American television actresses
20th-century American actresses
21st-century American actresses
African-American actresses
American people of Chinese descent
Actresses from Los Angeles
Juilliard School alumni
American stage actresses
21st-century African-American people
21st-century African-American women
Year of birth missing (living people)